Nsoatre is a town in the Bono region of Ghana. The town is known for the Sacred Heart Secondary School.  The school is a second cycle institution.

References

Populated places in the Bono Region